Joko, Jaka, or Djoko (Javanese: ꦗꦏ) is a Javanese male name which means "young unmarried man" or "boy". Notable people with this name include:

 Djoko Iskandar, an Indonesian herpetologist
 Djoko Santoso, a retired Indonesian general
 Djoko Susanto, an Indonesian entrepreneur and businessman
 Djoko Suyanto, the Commander of the Indonesian National Armed Forces from 2006 to 2007
 Djoko Tjandra (born Tjan Kok Hui), a businessman and corruption felon
Dwi Joko Prihatin, an Indonesian footballer
 Jaka Singgih, an Indonesian businessman and politician
 Joko Anwar, an Indonesian filmmaker
 Joko Pinurbo, an Indonesian poet
 Joko Pitoyo or Joko Pitono, a senior figure in the militant Islamic group Jemaah Islamiyah (JI) and one of the most wanted terrorists in Southeast Asia
 Joko Ribowo, an Indonesian professional footballer
Joko Riyadi, a former badminton player from Indonesia
 Joko Sasongko, an Indonesian footballer
Joko Sidik, an Indonesian footballer
 Joko Suprianto, an Indonesian former badminton player
 Joko Tingkir, the founder and the first king of the Sultanate of Pajang
 Joko Widodo, an Indonesian politician
 Sapardi Djoko Damono, an Indonesian poet

Javanese names